Sedbergh School is a public school (English private boarding and day school) in the town of Sedbergh in Cumbria, in North West England. It comprises a junior school for pupils aged 4 to 13 and the main school for 13 to 18 year olds. It was established in 1525.

History

Roger Lupton was born at Cautley in the parish of Sedbergh, Yorkshire, in 1456 and he provided for a Chantry School in Sedbergh in 1525 while he was Provost of Eton. By 1528, land had been bought, a school built, probably on the site of the present school library, and the foundation deed had been signed. Lupton's subsequent donations to the school's Sedbergh scholars of numerous scholarships and fellowships to St John's College, Cambridge succeeded in binding the school to St John's, and gave the Cambridge college power over the appointment of Sedbergh's Headmasters. Lupton's statutes state that if any of the last four of the St John's College scholarships are left vacant for a year, unless for a reason approved by the provost and fellows of King's College Cambridge, the lands are to revert to Lupton's next of kin. Lupton added that he was certain that St John's would not be found negligent in so pious a work.  It was this link to St John's that probably saved Sedbergh in 1546–48 when most chantries were dissolved and their assets seized by Henry VIII's Commission.

Sedbergh was re-established and re-endowed as a grammar school in 1551 and the fortunes of the school in the coming centuries seem to have depended very much on the character and abilities of the headmasters with pupil numbers fluctuating and reaching as low a total as 8 day boys in the early 19th century.

One particularly successful period was during the Headship of John Harrison Evans (1838–61) who restored the prestige and achievements of the school and also funded the building of the Market Hall and Reading Room in the town. By 1857, the fellowships and scholarships which, since Lupton's time, had formed this link between the Sedbergh scholars and St John's College, ceased to be specially connected with Sedbergh. By 1860, the Lupton scholarships were combined and re-arranged under the name of the Lupton and Hebblethwaite Exhibitions.

A more independent Governing Body was established in 1874 in a successful bid to maintain Sedbergh's independence (amalgamation with Giggleswick had been suggested) and the first meeting took place in the Bull Inn in Sedbergh in December.

In the 1870s there was a tremendous amount of development and building work at Sedbergh, under the careful eye of the headmaster, Frederick Heppenstall. This included the Headmaster's House (now School House), classrooms, a chapel and four other boarding houses.

Henry George Hart took over as headmaster in 1880 and his tenure saw a new chapel built in 1897, the founding of the Old Sedberghian Club in 1897/98, the creation of the prefectorial system, the inaugural Wilson run and the confirmation of the school motto "Dura Virum Nutrix" (Stern Nurse of Men).

In 1989 the number of boys in the school exceeded 500 for the first time, during the headship of Dr R G Baxter. Two years later a new coat of arms was granted to the school and it was visited by the Queen and the Duke of Edinburgh.

In 2005 the school was one of fifty of the country's leading independent schools which were found guilty of running an illegal price-fixing cartel which had allowed them to drive up fees for thousands of parents. Each school was required to pay a nominal penalty of £10,000 and all agreed to make ex-gratia payments totalling £3 million into a trust designed to benefit pupils who attended the schools during the period in respect of which fee information was shared.

The governing body decided to open the school to girls in 1999 and the first girls were admitted in 2001. While the pupils are still predominantly boys, the number of girls attending has increased dramatically since the move into coeducation. The previous headmaster, Christopher Hirst, brought in the change to co-educational schooling from single-sex."

In January 2009 the Junior School moved from Bentham to join the senior school in Sedbergh. The Junior School has accommodation for both day and boarding boys and girls aged 3–13. On 26 February 2013, it was announced that the school would merge with Casterton School.

Despite its long history, The Good Schools Guide notes how “Sedbergh has faced up to the demands of the 21st century but managed to retain traditional values and ethos. Its increasing numbers indicate parents very much approve. It rightly retains its formidable reputation on the sports field but away from it, provides a happy and caring environment for all its pupils regardless of ability or sports prowess.”

Junior School

The junior school was opened in 2002. It was previously located on the site of the former Bentham Grammar School after it was closed and Sedbergh took over its premises. In 2009 it moved to a site next to the main school. The school relocated again in September 2013 to the site of the former Casterton School for girls and is now known as Casterton, Sedbergh Preparatory School. Casterton was absorbed into Sedbergh, with senior girls transferring to the main school and junior pupils remaining at the Casterton campus. Boarding is offered to Junior School pupils aged 8 and above.

Rong Qiao Sedbergh School 
Opened in 2018, Sedburgh's international school, Rong Qiao Sedbergh School is located in Fuzhou, Fujian Province, China. It is a partnership between Sedbergh School and the Rong Qiao Group. Offering education for children from the ages of 3 to 18, its ethos draws on both English and Chinese teaching practice. 10% of students are international students, and 90% are Chinese nationals.

House system
Like most traditional public schools, the house system is incorporated with the boarding programme and most pupils are boarders. Most pupils at Sedbergh live in a boarding house, of which there are nine (six for boys, three for girls) chosen when applying to the school. It is here that he or she both sleeps and takes their daily meals. Day pupils are fully integrated into the programme and participate in activities. Houses compete amongst one another in school competitions such as debating, academic challenge (a University Challenge-style quiz) and 'House Unison' (a traditional singing competition), and in particular in sporting competitions, for example the seriously contested Senior Seniors (Inter-House rugby) and the Wilson Run. Houses are named mostly after illustrious Old Sedberghians or Headmasters.

Each house also has a set of house colours, which adorns the blazers of boys and girls in fifth form and below as well as on various house sports clothing. Pupils who throughout their school career demonstrate great service to their house are awarded their house colours by their Housemaster/ mistress. Sedberghians take immense pride in being awarded house colours which take the form of a scarf and a tie in the colours of their house.

The boarding houses also each have their own house magazine, named after the emblem of the house (for example, the magazine of Hart House is called The Jay), written and edited by the pupils within the house.

Sedbergh Junior School, now Casterton, Sedbergh Preparatory School, located in Casterton, near Kirkby Lonsdale, also has Cressbrook House for boarding boys and Beale for boarding girls.

Senior houses

Junior houses
 Cressbrook House (boys)
 Beale House (girls)
 Thornfield House (Senior prep school girls)

Extracurricular activities

Clubs and societies
Sedbergh offers outdoor pursuits as well as academic societies, including 'The Headmaster's Society' which is for Academic Scholars in the Sixth Form and chaired by the Headmaster. It is a forum for debate and discussion of major topical issues based upon papers delivered by the pupils and it also hosts talks given by intellectuals and public figures. The junior academic society is known as the 'Phoenix Society'.

Sedbergh's other academic club is the Dinner Debating Society which meets twice termly for black-tie 'dinner debates' hosted by Housemasters.

Sedbergh's has an Outdoor Pursuits Club. Activities organised in the local area by the club include climbing, gill scrambling and pot-holing as well as mountain biking and fell walking.

Sport
Sedbergh has a sporting tradition. Many Old Sedberghians have national caps and international tournament experience or have represented the school at county or national level.

Sedbergh is renowned for producing rugby football players, including the England captains Wavell Wakefield, John Spencer and Will Carling, and the world cup winner Will Greenwood. Sedbergh is represented in the Rugby Union Guinness Premiership at the time of writing by seven players at first or second team level in four different clubs. In November 2010 the school rugby team was named "School Team of the Year" at the Aviva Daily Telegraph School Sport Matters Awards after going the entire previous season undefeated.

The school has hosted Cumberland and Minor Counties cricket matches on several occasions.  In 2019 Lancashire County Cricket Club played their county championship match v Durham at Sedbergh School, even though the town of Sedbergh itself was originally in Yorkshire, and has been in Cumbria since county boundary changes in 1974.

Anti-Assassins Rugby Club
The Anti-Assassins Rugby Club (A-As) was founded in 1950 when Sedbergh Old Boys were invited to pick a Northern team to play against the masters and Old Boys (The Assassins) of Sedbergh School. Now this invitational team plays as SpoonAAs (Spoon Anti-Assassins) as it raises funds for the Wooden Spoon charity.

Traditions
As with many English public schools, Sedbergh has developed its own traditions unique to the school.

Wilson Run

One of the unique school traditions is the Wilson Run, also known as the "Ten Mile" or "The Ten"; it is named after Bernard Wilson (the first housemaster of Sedgwick House). The race distance is just over 10 miles (10 miles 385 yards), about 7 miles of which crosses the surrounding fells with the rest going along roads. Pupils must qualify to take part in the race over an 11-mile training route which covers most of the race route. The race is one of the longest, hardest and most gruelling school runs in the country and has been a tradition for well over 100 years. The run has been cancelled only three times, owing to epidemic (1936), snow (1947) and the foot and mouth epidemic.

School song
Winder is the school song for Sedbergh School, named after the fell that dominates the northern skyline of the school. The hill is a gateway to the Howgill Fells and school tradition dictates that pupils must climb it at least once during their time at Sedbergh.

The song is sung at all major school events such as the Wilson Run.

Buildings and features

Chapel

This was built in Perpendicular style in 1895–97, and was designed by the Lancaster architects Austin and Paley.

Chapel organ
The school took delivery of a custom built, four manual organ console in November 2015, which replaced an organ that was acquired from the Church of St. Mary Magdalene, Hucknall. This two manual instrument had been built by Nigel Church and moved to the school by David Wells in 1994. The instrument can now be found in a church in Lincolnshire.

War cloisters
The cloisters at Sedbergh are a monument to old boys and masters of the school killed during the Great War and the Second World War. The cloisters were dedicated in 1924 and then re-dedicated after the Second World War. The cloisters were restored and partially rebuilt in 2005 and on Remembrance Day again re-dedicated after an appeal had raised over £130,000 for the necessary work.

The school also has a separate memorial for Old Sedberghians awarded the Victoria Cross, of which there are four. Brigadier Jock Campbell who won the Military Cross in the First World War and the Victoria Cross at the battle of Sidi Rezegh in the Second and was a member of Evans House.
Three of the Old Sedberghian winners of the Victoria Cross were Old Sedgwickians, RJT Digby-Jones at Wagon Hill in 1900 in the Boer War, George Ward Gunn at Sidi Rezegh in 1941 and Kenneth Campbell over Brest Harbour, also in 1941.

Four Battle of Britain pilots attended the school. Pilot Officer Desmond Kay DFC & Bar, Pilot Officer Noel Benson were killed during the war, but Flt Lt Kenneth Stoddart AE, and Flying Officer Alec Worthington survived.

Headmasters

Notable Old Sedberghians

Military 
Major General Henry Templer Alexander CB CBE DSO, Army Commander
Lt-Colonel John William Balfour Paul, DSO, Scottish Officer of Arms
Major General "Jock" Campbell VC DSO and Bar MC, a commander of the 7th Armoured Division and recipient of the Victoria Cross
Flying Officer Kenneth Campbell VC, Royal Air Force pilot and recipient of the Victoria Cross
General Sir Robert Archibald Cassels, GCB GCSI DSO, Indian Army officer
Colonel Freddie Spencer Chapman DSO and Bar ED, naturalist, mountaineer, explorer, war hero
Group Captain Walter Myers Churchill DSO DFC, Royal Air Force, Second World War
Air Commodore Duncan le Geyt Pitcher CMG, CBE, DSO, RAF, Army and Royal Air Force
Lieutenant Robert James Thomas Digby-Jones VC, Royal Engineers Officer and recipient of the Victoria Cross
Lieutenant-General Sir Andrew Richard Gregory KBE CB, British Army officer
Second Lieutenant George Ward Gunn VC MC, Royal Horse Artillery Officer and recipient of the Victoria Cross
Major David F. O. Russell MC FRSE, 20th century businessman, philanthropist and noted war hero
Major-General Jonathan David Shaw CB CBE, British Army officer and Assistant Chief of Defence Staff
Admiral Sir Jock Slater GCB LVO DL, First Sea Lord and Chief of Naval Staff
General Sir John Stuart Mackenzie Shea GCB KCMG DSO, British Army officer
Wing Commander Sir Kenneth Stoddart KCVO KStJ AE JP LLD, Battle of Britain pilot
Major General Michael Walsh CB DSO, British Army Officer and Chief Scout

Politics and law 
William George Ainslie, ironmaster and MP for North Lonsdale 1885–1892
Glencairn Balfour Paul CMG, British Ambassador to Iraq, Jordan and Tunisia
Thomas Bingham, Baron Bingham of Cornhill, Senior Law Lord, former Master of the Rolls and Lord Chief Justice
Brendan Bracken, 1st Viscount Bracken, Politician, businessman and associate of Winston Churchill.
Sandy Bruce-Lockhart, Baron Bruce-Lockhart, OBE, Chairman of the Local Government Association
Sir Alan Chambré, English judge
Sir Hugh Cortazzi, Author, diplomat and prominent Japanologist
Sir Maurice Dorman, Governor-General of Sierra Leone and Colonial Governor of Malta
Richard Bostock Dorman CBE, Diplomat and High Commissioner
Professor Sir David Alexander Ogilvy Edward, Scottish lawyer and academic, and former Judge of the Court of Justice of the European Communities
Edward John Eyre, Explorer and Governor of Jamaica.
Sir Russell Fairgrieve, politician
Sir Michael Bowen Hanley KCB, Head of MI5
Baron Haskel of Higher Broughton, Labour Party politician
Laurence Helsby, Baron Helsby, Head of British Civil Service
H. Montgomery Hyde, author and politician
John Lowther, 1st Viscount Lonsdale, First Lord of the Treasury and Lord Privy Seal
James Lupton, Baron Lupton, Conservative peer
Count Andrew McMillan, Baron of Cleghorn, philanthropist 
James MacColl, politician
 Sir Richard McCombe, Lord Justice of Appeal
Brian McConnell, Baron McConnell, Northern Ireland politician and member of the House of Lords
Stephen O'Brien, Conservative Party Member of Parliament
 Sir John Otway, Lawyer and Royalist
Charles Peat, Politician and Principal Private Secretary to Winston Churchill
Sir Francis Powell, 1st Baronet, Conservative Party Member of Parliament
Sir Robert Rhodes James, politician and author
Robert Rowland, Member European Parliament South East England The Brexit Party
Sir Michael Alexander Geddes Sachs, First English solicitor appointed as a High Court judge
Sir Giles Shaw, Politician. wrote his memoir, 'In the Long Run' published by the Memoir Club
Michael Shaw, Baron Shaw of Northstead, Politician
Sir Thomas Broun Smith (1915–1988), QC FBA FRSE etc, Scots jurist and Professor of Law
Joseph Stanley Snowden, British Liberal Party politician and barrister
John Studholme, British pioneer of New Zealand, farmer and politician
David Waddington, Baron Waddington, British Home Secretary, Lord Privy Seal, Leader of the House of Lords, Governor of Bermuda.
Robert Warnock, Circuit judge
David Wood, Circuit judge
Bill Carritt, Communist revolutionary, Carritt family member, college lecturer, humanitarian aid organiser, campaigner for the Scottsboro Boys
Noel Carritt, Communist revolutionary, Carritt family member, International Brigadier, head of biology at Dr Challoner's Grammar School
Michael Carritt, Communist revolutionary, Carritt family member, anti-colonial spy, expert on Indian politics, philosophy lecturer at Oxford University

Business
Montague Ainslie, Forester and businessman
 Kenny Hirst-Sewell, Academic Sporting Legend, Managing Director of Taylor Maxwell
Adam Applegarth, Ex-CEO of Northern Rock bank
Philip Hedley Bowcock, CEO of William Hill Plc
Christian Bjelland, Norwegian businessman and chairman of the National Gallery of Norway
Sir Christopher Bland, Chairman of B.T. Group, businessman and former Chairman of the BBC
John Charlesworth Dodgson-Charlesworth, Colliery owner and M.P.
Sir Roger Gifford, Banker, Alderman and Lord Mayor of London
Sir Mark Hudson, Former Chairman of the Council of the Duchy of Lancaster
James Lupton, Lord Lupton of Lovington, Banker, Trustee of the British Museum
Sir (John) Hubert Worthington, English architect

The arts, literature and humanities 
John Arden, dramatist
Greig Barr, Fellow and Rector of Exeter College, Oxford
Sir John Christopher Malcolm Baynes, 7th Bt., author
Simon Beaufoy, Screenwriter and 2009 Oscar winner for Slumdog Millionaire. Wrote The Full Monty.
Leonard Boden, Scottish portrait painter
Timothy Birdsall, Cartoonist
Colin Blakely, British character actor
JB Blanc, British film actor
William George Clark, English classical and Shakespearean scholar
Henry Wilkinson Cookson, Master of Peterhouse, Cambridge, and five times Vice-Chancellor of Cambridge
William Craven, Master of St. John's College, Cambridge, and Vice-Chancellor of Cambridge
Ernest Crawley, English schoolmaster, sexologist, anthropologist, sports journalist and exponent of ball games
Hugh I'Anson Fausset, Literary critic, biographer, poet and religious writer
Arthur Foxton Ferguson, English baritone, lecturer and German translator
Assheton Gorton, Production designer and Academy Award nominee
Mark Herman, film director and screenwriter
Tim Kevan, English writer and barrister
Francis Llewellyn Griffith, British Egyptologist
Rab Bruce Lockhart, Scottish educationist and rugby union player
Dugald Bruce Lockhart, actor 
Phillip Mason, author 
Alan Macfarlane, Professor Emeritus of Anthropology, King's College, Cambridge
Colin Matthew, historian and the first editor of the Oxford Dictionary of National Biography
Fergus McDonell, film editor and director
Jim Muir, BBC Middle East correspondent
Nigel D. Oram, public servant, military officer and anthropologist
Barry Pain, journalist, poet and writer
George Edwards Peacock, eminent Australian colonial artist
Adam Rickitt, actor, singer, model and one time Conservative parliamentary candidate
F. A. Ridley, historian and Marxist
Simon Slater, musician and TV and film actor
Richard Smyth, English school headmaster and cricketer.
Sir Archibald Strong, Australian scholar and poet
Richard Suart, Opera singer and actor
Mark Umbers, actor - theatre and film
Adrian Gibson, musician (trumpet)  , theatre shows (Jackson 5, Jimmy Osmond,) various TV and Radio appearances
Roger Vignoles, piano accompanist
James Walker né Chalton, member of the Royal Shakespeare Company and screen actor
John Dawson Watson, British painter and illustrator
James Wilby, actor
William John Woodhouse, classical scholar and author

A former teacher at the school was Henry Watson Fowler, the writer of A Dictionary of Modern English Usage

Science and exploration
Peter Addyman, British archaeologist
Wilfred Eade Agar, Anglo-Australian zoologist
Anthony Askew, Physician and book collector
Peter Barwick, English physician and author
George Birkbeck, doctor, academic, philanthropist and early pioneer in adult education
Christopher Chippindale, Stonehenge archaeologist
John Cranke, mathematician and mentor
John Dawson, surgeon and mathematician
G. M. B. Dobson, Fellow of the Royal Society and President of the Royal Meteorological Society
Anthony Fothergill, Physician
John Fothergill, Physician, plant collector, philanthropist
Thomas Garnett, English physician and natural philosopher
Thomas Gaskin, Clergyman and academic, now known for contributions to mathematics
John Hammersley, British mathematician
John Haygarth, physician who discovered the benefits of segregating/quarantining sick patients
John Hymers, English mathematician, Fellow of the Royal Society and founder of Hymers College
John Walter Guerrier Lund, CBE FRS, English psychologist
Sir Roderick McQuhae Mackenzie of Scatwell, 12th Bt., Fellow of the Royal College of Physicians
Dr Digby McLaren, Geologist and palaeontologist
Edward Max Nicholson, Founder of the World Wildlife Fund
George Peacock, English mathematician
Sir Isaac Pennington, Physician
James Hogarth Pringle, Pioneer in surgical practice 
Adam Sedgwick, Founder of modern geology
Edmund Sharpe, Architect and engineer
 George Sherriff OBE, Scottish explorer and plant collector
Robert Swan OBE, Polar explorer: the first man in history to walk to both the North and South Poles
Roger Cuthbert Wakefield, Surveyor
Robert Willan, the father of modern dermatology
Mark Alexander Wynter-Blyth, Lepidopterist and schoolmaster
Professor Ian Young OBE, Engineering innovator in medicine

Sport
David Barnes, Chairman of the Professional Rugby Players' Association 
James Botham, Welsh rugby union player
Harry Brook, England Cricketer
John Bruce Lockhart, Scottish cricketer and schoolmaster
Logie Bruce Lockhart, Scotland rugby union player and headmaster of Gresham's School
Will Carling OBE, England rugby union captain
Jordan Clark, Professional cricketer - fifth ever to score six sixes in an over
Simon Cross rugby union
Arthur Dorward, Scotland rugby union captain
Ewan Dowes rugby league
Phil Dowson England rugby union player
Rob Elloway, German rugby union international
Carl Fearns, rugby union
Tomas Francis, Wales Rugby Union international 
Will Greenwood MBE, England rugby union player
Jamie Harrison, cricketer
George Hill, England County Cricketer
Peter Kininmonth, Scotland rugby union captain
Mike McCarthy Ireland rugby union international
Mandy Mitchell-Innes, England cricketer
James Park-Johnson, first-class cricketer
Cameron Redpath, Scotland international rugby union player
Matt Revis, England County Cricketer
James Rogers, first-class cricketer
Chris Sanders, first-class cricketer
Archie Scott, Scottish first-class cricketer; oldest ever living Scottish first-class cricketer
James Simpson-Daniel England rugby union player
Robert Skene, first-class cricketer
John Spencer, England rugby union captain
David Tait, rugby union
Freddie Tait, golfer
Wavell Wakefield, 1st Baron Wakefield of Kendal England rugby union captain

Religion
Nicholas John Willoughby Barker, British Anglican priest
John Barwick, Royalist churchman and Dean of St. Paul's Cathedral
Francis Blackburne, Archdeacon
Henry Lowther Clarke, first Archbishop of Melbourne
Ingram Cleasby, Dean of Chester
John Duckett, Catholic priest and martyr
Sir George Fleming, Bishop of Carlisle
Walker King, Bishop of Rochester 
Thomas Kipling, Early churchman and academic
Christopher Charles Luxmoore, Bishop of Bermuda
William Stuart MacPherson, Dean of Lichfield
Christopher John Mayfield, Bishop of Wolverhampton and Bishop of Manchester
Rt. Rev. Thomas Otway, Seventeenth century Anglican bishop in Ireland
Richard Parkinson, Canon of Manchester Cathedral, college principal, theologian and antiquarian
Michael Peck, Dean of Lincoln
Reginald Richard Roseveare, Anglican bishop
James Wilson, Theologian and astronomer
Tom Wright, Bishop of Durham and a leading British New Testament scholar.

References

External links

School Website
Old Sedberghian Club
Profile on the ISC website
ISI Inspection Reports - Junior School and Senior School
School League Tables for Cumbria - Daily Telegraph Website

Private schools in Cumbria
1525 establishments in England
Member schools of the Headmasters' and Headmistresses' Conference

Boarding schools in Cumbria
Educational institutions established in the 1520s
Sedbergh